Old Hartwick Village Cemetery, also known as Robinson Cemetery, is a historic cemetery located near Hartwick in Otsego County, New York.  The cemetery was established in 1797 and contains approximately 300 burials.  The markers date from the late-1790s through about 1880, with the majority dated between about 1825 and 1865.

It was listed on the National Register of Historic Places in 2013.

References

External links
 

Cemeteries on the National Register of Historic Places in New York (state)
1797 establishments in New York (state)
Buildings and structures in Otsego County, New York
National Register of Historic Places in Otsego County, New York